Idalus critheis is a moth of the family Erebidae. It was described by Herbert Druce in 1884. It is found in French Guiana, Guyana, Brazil, Venezuela, Colombia, Ecuador, Peru and Panama.

References

 

critheis
Moths described in 1884